The Fate of Renate Langen is a 1931 German drama film directed by Rudolf Walther-Fein and starring Mady Christians, Francis Lederer and Hilde Hildebrand.

Cast
 Mady Christians as Renate Langen
 Francis Lederer as Gerd
 Hilde Hildebrand as Marion
 Alfred Abel as Dr. Walter Langen
 Rolf Drucker as Peter, Sohn der Familie Langen
 Heinrich Schroth as Schrott
 Gustav Rickelt as Kapitän Haase
 Hans Sternberg as Bollmann
 Viktor Senger
 Hermann Picha as Detective

References

Bibliography

External links 
 

1931 films
Films of the Weimar Republic
1930s German-language films
Films directed by Rudolf Walther-Fein
Films scored by Friedrich Hollaender
German drama films
1931 drama films
German black-and-white films
1930s German films